The Encounter is an American television series with a Christian theme that ran the first season in 2016 and returned in 2020 with a second season. It derived from a 2011 film of the same name and ran over eight episodes in 2016 and, again 8, in 2020, each featuring a Christ-like figure, known as "The Man" (played by Bruce Marchiano), appearing in modern-day U.S. settings.

Cast
 Bruce Marchiano as "The Man" (Jesus Christ)

Episodes

External links
 

American anthology television series
2016 American television series debuts
2016 American television series endings